is a Japanese actress, gravure idol and tarento. She is represented by the Oscar Promotion Company.

Filmography

TV series

TV drama

Films

Radio

Solo photo albums

Videography

Bibliography

Music videos

References

Notes

External links
Official blog 
Fumie Nakajima's produce brand Fumicha 
Oscar Promotion's be amie introduction 
Sponichi Idol Report: Fumie Nakajima 
Chachamaru & Fumie no wanda Furo 

Japanese television personalities
Actors from Nagano Prefecture
1968 births
Living people